The John Muir Trail (JMT) (Paiute: Nüümü Poyo, N-ue-mue Poh-yo) is a long-distance trail in the Sierra Nevada mountain range of California, passing through Yosemite,  Kings Canyon and Sequoia National Parks. For almost all of its length, the trail is in the High Sierra backcountry and wilderness areas. It is named after John Muir, a naturalist.

The vast majority of the trail is situated within designated wilderness. The trail passes through large swaths of alpine and high mountain scenery, and lies almost entirely at or above  in elevation. The trail sees about 1,500 thru-hiking attempts each year (including Pacific Crest Trail thru-hikers), many fewer than the number of attempts on comparable walks such as the southern portion of Appalachian Trail or the Way of St. James. It has been described as "America's most famous trail".

History

Paiute trade routes 
Prior to the arrival of European-American settlers, the Paiute people living in the High Sierra region utilized a series of ancestral trails for hunting and trade with neighboring indigenous groups. In an effort to acknowledge the original people who traveled this region, some modern Native American and environmental organizations recognize the JMT as Nüümü Poyo, which translates to "Paiute Road," "Paiute Trail," or "People's Trail."

Proposal 
The idea of a trail along the backbone of the High Sierra originated with Theodore Solomons. Solomons later recalled that the concept originated in his adolescence. "The idea of a crest-parallel trail came to me one day while herding my uncle's cattle in an immense unfenced alfalfa field near Fresno. It was 1884 and I was 14." He began advocating construction of the trail shortly after the Sierra Club was founded in 1892. John Muir was a founding member and first president of the Sierra Club. Solomons explored the area now known as the Evolution Basin, and traveled extensively throughout the High Sierra, exploring possible trail routes. Joseph Nisbet LeConte took up the cause in 1898 and the proposed trail was originally called the "High Sierra Trail", although that name was later given to a different trail, running in the east–west direction. LeConte spent years exploring the canyons and passes of the Kings River and Kern River, and climbing peaks along the proposed trail. Along with James S. Hutchinson and Duncan McDuffie, he pioneered a high mountain route in 1908 from Yosemite National Park to Kings Canyon, roughly along the route of the modern JMT. In 28 days, they completed a trip of 228 miles through the high mountains, including several previously unexplored sections. In 1914, the Sierra Club appointed a committee to cooperate with the State of California to begin construction of the trail. John Muir died later that year, and the proposed trail was renamed in his honor.

Trail construction 
Construction of the JMT began in 1915, a year after Muir's death, with a $10,000 appropriation from the California legislature and Governor Hiram Johnson. State Engineer Wilbur F. McClure was made responsible for overseeing the project and selecting the final route, though he secured the cooperation of the United States Forest Service, which managed and supervised much of the actual construction, and LeConte was very influential regarding the eventual routing of the trail. The California state legislature made additional appropriations of $10,000 each in 1917, 1925, 1927 and 1929.

After the Depression began, assistance from the California state government came to an end, so the remainder of the trail had to be funded by a joint effort between the Forest Service and the National Park Service. At this time, there were still two difficult sections yet to be completed. The task of constructing trail down the steep southern side of the pass required crews to blast sections out of the rock, a dangerous process that resulted in the death of trail crew member Donald I. Downs in 1930. A plaque near the base of the pass memorializes Downs today.

The Forest Service completed the final section at Palisade Creek (in the Palisade Group) in 1938. This section passes by the headwaters of the Middle Fork of the Kings River and over Mather Pass by the "Golden Staircase" to the headwaters of the South Fork of the Kings River. Shortly after, this section was incorporated into newly created Kings Canyon National Park. The entire project had taken 46 years to complete. William Edward Colby, the first secretary of the Sierra Club, called the finished trail "a most appropriate memorial to John Muir, who spent many of the best years of his life exploring the region which it will make accessible."

Route

From its northern terminus in Yosemite Valley, the trail runs southeast, passing south of Half Dome and then on to Tuolumne Meadows. From Tuolumne Meadows the trail turns south, running parallel to the main range of the Sierra Nevada, through Yosemite National Park, Inyo and Sierra national forests (including the John Muir Wilderness and Ansel Adams Wilderness), passing through Devils Postpile National Monument, Kings Canyon National Park, and ending on Mount Whitney in Sequoia National Park. From the southern terminus of the JMT at the summit of Mount Whitney, an additional  hike on the Mount Whitney Trail is required to reach the nearest trailhead at Whitney Portal, thus making an end-to-end traverse of the JMT effectively .

Yosemite National Park
The trail begins at the Happy Isle bridge near the Happy Isles Nature Center. The trail ascends steeply up a paved incline before crossing another bridge meeting with the junction with the Mist Trail. The trail continues along a cut into Panorama Cliff, called the "Ice Cut". Although broad and well-traveled, hazardous winter conditions and close proximity to civilization (attracting large numbers of day hikers) make this one of the most dangerous parts of the trail.

After some elevation gain via long switchbacks, the trail reaches the top of Nevada Falls. The trail continues into Little Yosemite Valley, past the trail junctions to Half Dome and Cloud's Rest, and then into a subalpine basin and passing the Sunrise High Sierra Camp. The trail then crosses the Cathedral Range at Cathedral Pass before dropping steeply into Tuolumne Meadows, a common resupply point. The trail passes a visitor's center and some campgrounds before linking up with the Pacific Crest Trail. The John Muir Trail/Pacific Crest Trail then turns south, through the mild Lyell Canyon meadow, and crosses the Cathedral Range again and exits the park at Donahue Pass.

Ansel Adams Wilderness and Devils Postpile National Monument

At the crest of Donahue Pass, the trail enters Inyo National Forest and the Ansel Adams Wilderness. The trail passes Thousand Island Lake, Garnet Lake, and a number of smaller lakes. The trail continues into Devils Postpile National Monument, where there are a number of opportunities to resupply or exit the trail. Devil's Postpile is located a short distance from the trail.

Kings Canyon National Park and Sequoia National Park
The John Muir Trail next enters Kings Canyon National Park and Sequoia National Park crossing some spectacular alpine regions, including Evolution Basin, the Golden Staircase, and Forester Pass. The trail ends at the summit of Mount Whitney, the highest point in the contiguous United States. From the summit of Mount Whitney, the closest trailhead is Whitney Portal.

Elevation
The trail stays at high elevations, mostly above  and with the exception of the first 7 miles directly south of the trail's northern terminus, it never drops below . At , Forester Pass is also the highest point along the Pacific Crest Trail.

When the United States Geological Survey calculated the official length of the trail, elevation gain and loss was not taken into consideration. Rather, the triangle inequality implies that the error due to neglecting elevation changes underestimates the true length by no greater than this value.

In total, the trail gains  in elevation.

Hiking

The primary hiking season is usually from July through September; during this time, most of the snow from the previous year has melted, but new snow hasn't fallen yet. Early season hikers have to contend not only with the snowpack and icy slopes near the passes, but with streams swollen with snowmelt. Trail conditions are less demanding later in the season after the snowmelt concludes, and the weather generally remains pleasant for hiking through September. Weather during the hiking season is generally sunny and dry, but afternoon thunderstorms are not uncommon. The trail is used primarily by backpackers and dayhikers, but also by runners, trail riders, and pack trains. There is a shelter for hikers to stay at on Muir Pass, called the John Muir Hut, which is the only shelter on the trail.

Hikers completing the trail typically take about three weeks. The record for the fastest known time was set by ultrarunner François D'Haene in 2017, who ran from south to north in two days, 19 hours, and 26 minutes. The previous record of three days, seven hours, and 36 minutes was set by Leor Pantilat in 2014. The record for the fastest trip in an unsupported way was set by Aurelien Sanchez in 2018, who ran from south to north in three days, 3 hours, and 55 minutes. The previous record of three days, ten hours, and 59 minutes was set by Andrew Bentz in 2014.

A permit is required to hike the JMT, which can be obtained from the national park or forest where the hiker begins the hike, and is available  168 days in advance. This single permit is valid for the entire hike. Permit reservations can be hard to obtain for JMT thru-hikers, but a portion of permits are reserved for walk-ins. The Whitney Portal end of the JMT has a lottery for wilderness permits, and hikers starting in Yosemite face competition with other backpackers simply wanting to camp overnight while hiking Half Dome or to Tuolumne Meadows. Backpackers entering the Sierra backcountry on multi-day trips are generally required to carry their food in approved hard-sided storage containers known as bear canisters to protect their food and other scented items from theft by black bears, which are common in the region.

About 90-96 percent of hikers hike north to south, from Yosemite Valley to Mt. Whitney. There are advantages to starting in Yosemite Valley and hiking south. Although there is a significant net altitude gain this way, starting at a lower altitude allows the hiker time to acclimate to the elevations of the trail rather than immediately having to tackle a 6,000-foot (1,800 m) climb to the summit of Mount Whitney. In addition, there are several resupply points convenient to the JMT during its northern half (Tuolumne Meadows, Reds Meadow, Vermillion Valley Resort, Muir Trail Ranch), allowing the hiker to carry a lighter food load early in the hike and also to exit the trail easily if problems arise. The southern half of the JMT is more remote and generally higher in elevation, thus making it more appropriate for the second half of the hike when maximum conditioning has been attained.

See also
 Ecology of the Sierra Nevada
 Long-distance trails in the United States
 Sierra High Route

Notes

References

Bibliography

External links
 John Muir Trail topographic maps
 John Muir Trail Journals and Photography

Hiking trails in California
Sierra Nevada (United States)
Long-distance trails in the United States
Sierra Club
Trail
Sequoia National Park
Kings Canyon National Park
Yosemite National Park
1915 establishments in California
Protected areas established in 1915